The 1961 New Zealand Grand Prix was a motor race held at the Ardmore Circuit on 7 January 1961.

Classification

References

New Zealand Grand Prix
Grand Prix
January 1961 sports events in New Zealand